Kuybyshevo is a rural locality (a settlement) and the administrative center of Kuybyshevsky Selsoviet, Rubtsovsky District, Altai Krai, Russia. The population was 966 as of 2013. There are 8 streets.

Geography 
Kuybyshevo is located 18 km north of Rubtsovsk (the district's administrative centre) by road. Priozyorny is the nearest rural locality.

References 

Rural localities in Rubtsovsky District